During the 2009-10 season, Milton Keynes Lightning will participate in the semi-professional English Premier Ice Hockey League. It will be the 8th year of Ice Hockey played by MK Lightning.

Results

September

External links 
 MK Lightning Homepage

Milton Keynes Lightning seasons
Milt